The 1988–89 St. John's Redmen basketball team represented St. John's University during the 1988–89 NCAA Division I men's basketball season. The team was coached by Lou Carnesecca in his twenty first year at the school. St. John's home games are played at Alumni Hall and Madison Square Garden and the team is a member of the Big East Conference.

Off season

Departures

Class of 1988 signees

Incoming transfers

Roster

Schedule and results

|-
!colspan=9 style="background:#FF0000; color:#FFFFFF;"| Regular season

|-
!colspan=9 style="background:#FF0000; color:#FFFFFF;"| Big East tournament

|-
!colspan=9 style="background:#FF0000; color:#FFFFFF;"| NIT

References

St. John's Red Storm men's basketball seasons
St. John's
St. John's
National Invitation Tournament championship seasons
St John
St John